The carpet eel-blenny (Congrogadus subducens), also known as the green wolf eel or green wolf eel blenny, is a relatively large species of dottyback found in coastal parts of the Indo-West Pacific, including coral reefs, among rocks, seagrass beds, tidal flats  and in brackish habitats. Despite the common names, it is unrelated to the true wolf eel of the North Pacific, the true eel of the order Anguilliformes and the true blennies of the suborder Blennioidei.

The colour is very variable (green, brown, black or bluish; often with spots or blotches) and the carpet eel-blenny can change it to match the surroundings.

The carpet eel-blenny occasionally makes its way into the marine aquarium trade, but it is predatory and will eat crustaceans and smaller fish.

References

Congrogadinae
Fish described in 1843